Rocambole is a 1948 French-Italian historical thriller film directed by Jacques de Baroncelli and starring Pierre Brasseur, Sophie Desmarets and Lucien Nat. It portrays the adventures of the popular character Rocambole. It was followed by a sequel The Revenge of Baccarat.

It was shot at the Scalera Studios in Rome. The film's sets were designed by the art directors René Moulaert and Ottavio Scotti.

Cast
 Pierre Brasseur as Joseph Flippart dit 'Rocambole'  
 Sophie Desmarets as La comtesse Artoff dite 'Baccarat' 
 Lucien Nat as Andrea  
 Robert Arnoux as Ventura  
 Loredana as Carmen de Montevecchio  
 Roland Armontel as Le comte Artoff  
 Marcel Delaître as Doctor Blanche  
 Carla Candiani as Fanny  
 Vittorio Sanipoli as Arnaud, comte de Chamery  
 Ernesto Sabbatini as Marquis de Montevecchio  
 Attilio Dottesio 
 Luisa Rossi 
 Ginette Roy as Cerise 
 Marcello Giorda 
 Gualtiero Isnenghi 
 Silvia Manto 
 Nino Marchesini 
 Evelina Paoli 
 Mario Sailer as Le secrétaire / il segretario  
 Massimo Serato 
 Cristina Veronesi

References

Bibliography 
 Dayna Oscherwitz & MaryEllen Higgins. The A to Z of French Cinema. Scarecrow Press, 2009.

External links 
 

1948 films
1940s French-language films
Films directed by Jacques de Baroncelli
Films shot at Scalera Studios
Films set in the 19th century
French historical thriller films
Italian historical thriller films
1940s historical thriller films
Films based on French novels
French black-and-white films
Italian black-and-white films
Films scored by Renzo Rossellini
1940s French films
1940s Italian films